The double sculls event was a rowing event conducted as part of the 1964 Summer Olympics programme.

Medallists

Results

Heats

The top crew in each heat advanced to the final, with all others sent to the repechages.

Repechages

The top finisher in each of the three repechages joined the finalists.  The second and third-place finishers competed in a consolation final for 7th-12th places.  The fourth-place finisher, in the only repechage with that many competitors, was eliminated.

Consolation final

The consolation final determined places from 7th to 12th.

Final

References

Sources
 

Rowing at the 1964 Summer Olympics